Léon Boëllmann (25 September 1862 – 11 October 1897) was a French composer, known for a small number of compositions for organ. His best-known composition is Suite gothique (1895), which is a staple of the organ repertoire, especially its concluding Toccata.

Life
Boëllmann was born in Ensisheim, Haut-Rhin, Alsace, the son of a pharmacist. In 1871, at the age of nine, he entered the École de Musique Classique et Religieuse (L'École Niedermeyer) in Paris, where he studied with its director, Gustave Lefèvre, and with Eugène Gigout. There, Boëllmann won first prizes in piano, organ, counterpoint, fugue, plainsong, and composition. After his graduation in 1881, Boëllmann was hired as "organiste de choeur" at the Church of St. Vincent de Paul in the 10th arrondissement of Paris, and six years later he became cantor and organiste titulaire, a position he held until his early death, probably from tuberculosis.

In 1885, Boëllmann married Louise, the daughter of Gustave Lefèvre and the niece of Eugène Gigout, into whose house the couple moved (having no children of his own, Gigout adopted Boëllmann). Boëllmann then taught in Gigout's school of organ playing and improvisation.

As a favoured student of Gigout, Boëllmann moved in the best circles of the French musical world, and as a pleasing personality, he made friends of many artists and was able to give concerts both in Paris and the provinces. Boëllmann became known as "a dedicated teacher, trenchant critic, gifted composer and successful performer ... who coaxed pleasing sounds out of recalcitrant instruments". Boëllmann also wrote musical criticism for L'Art musical under the pseudonym "le Révérend Père Léon" and "un Garçon of the Salle Pleyel".

Boëllmann died in 1897, aged only 35. After the death of his wife the following year, Gigout reared their three orphans, one of whom, Marie-Louise Boëllmann-Gigout (1891–1977), became a noted organ teacher in her own right.

Works
During the sixteen years of his professional life, Boëllmann composed about 160 pieces in all genres. Faithful to the style of Franck and an admirer of Saint-Saëns, Boëllmann nonetheless exhibits a turn-of-the-century Post-romantic aesthetic which, especially in his organ works, demonstrates "remarkable sonorities". His best-known composition is Suite gothique (1895), now a staple of the organ repertoire, especially its concluding Toccata, a piece "of moderate difficulty but brilliant effect", with a dramatic minor theme and a rhythmic emphasis that made it popular even in Boëllmann's day. Boëllmann also wrote motets and art songs, works for piano, a symphony, works for cello, orchestra and organ as well as a cello sonata (dedicated to Jules Delsart), and other chamber works.

List of compositions

Organ
 Douze pièces, Op. 16 (1890)
 Suite gothique, Op. 25 (1895)
 Deuxième suite, Op. 27 (1896)
 Les Heures mystiques, Op. 29/30 (1896)
 Ronde française, Op. 37 (arr. Choisnel)
 Offertoire sur les Noëls
 Fantaisie

Piano
 Valse, Op. 8
 Deuxième valse, Op. 14
 Aubade, Op. 15 No. 1
 Feuillet d'album, Op. 15 No. 3
 2e Impromptu, Op. 15 No. 4
 Improvisations, Op. 28
 Nocturne, Op. 36
 Ronde française, Op. 37
 Gavotte
 Prélude & fugue
 Scherzo-Caprice

Chamber music
 Piano Quartet in F minor, Op. 10
 Piano Trio in G major, Op. 19
 Sonata for Cello and Piano in A minor, Op. 40
 Suite for Cello and Piano, Op. 6
 2 Pièces for cello and piano, Op. 31
 Pièce pour violoncelle et piano

Voice
 Conte d'amour, Op. 26 (3 mélodies)

Orchestra
 Fantaisie dialoguée, Op. 35, for organ and orchestra
 Intermezzo, for orchestra
 Ma bien aimée, for voice and orchestra
 Rondel, for small orchestra
 Scènes du Moyen-Âge, for orchestra
 Symphony in F major, Op. 24
 Variations symphoniques, Op. 23, for cello and orchestra

Selected recordings
 Suite gothique, Op. 25, Deuxième Suite, Op. 27, Offertoire sur des noëls, Carillon et Choral des Douze Pièces Op. 16, Deux esquisses, Fantaisie, Heures mystiques (extracts), Op. 29 & 30, Helga Schauerte-Maubouet, Kuhn organ of Minden cathedral, Germany: Syrius SYR 141374.

References

External links
 
 
 Concise biography of Boëllmann (same as link above but translated with Google into English)
 Detailed biography with some images 
 Detailed biography with some images (same link as above, but translated with Google into English)
 
 Leon Boëllmann Piano Quartet, Op.10 & Piano Trio, Op.19 Sound-bites
Verset de procession, for organ (From the Sibley Music Library Digital Score Collection)

1862 births
1897 deaths
19th-century classical composers
19th-century French composers
19th-century French male writers
19th-century French journalists
19th-century French male musicians
Composers for piano
Composers for pipe organ
French Romantic composers
French classical organists
French composers of sacred music
French male classical composers
French male journalists
French male writers
French music critics
French male organists
People from Haut-Rhin
Composers for pedal piano
Male classical organists
19th-century organists